Vivencio Baron Cuyugan, Sr. (January 13, 1895 – March 16, 1971) was a Filipino politician, boxer, and one of the founders of the socialist guerrilla group Hukbalahap. He was born in San Fernando, Pampanga, to Saturnino P. Cuyugan and Antonina Y. Baron. He studied in the United States where he supported himself through professional boxing and became known as the "Big Brown Filipino." He was appointed Municipal Vice-President of San Fernando in 1927, and later elected to the same position in 1931. He was later elected the first Municipal Mayor under the Philippine Commonwealth, the first socialist mayor of the Philippines. Together with Pedro Abad Santos, he was among the co-founders of the Socialist Party of the Philippines.

In 2017, the National Historical Commission of the Philippines honored Cuyugan as a hero with a historical marker in San Fernando, Pampanga, for being a "champion of social justice".

Personal life
He married Felisa Amurao of Cabiao, Nueva Ecija and had six children by her, namely: Aida, Fernando, Fe, Vivencio Jr., Panopio, and Dr. Ma. Luisa. There were children from other marriages: Estrella, Augustin, Saturnino, Syvestra, Antonia, Carlos, Manuel, and Juliet. He had five brothers and a sister.

Mayor of San Fernando
Cuyugan was the Mayor of San Fernando, Pampanga, from 1937 to 1942 and in 1945. He was also one of the leaders of the Aguman Ding Maldang Tagapagobra (AMT) or the General Workers Union.

Hukbalahap
In 1941, Cuyugan and several others founded the Hukbo ng Bayan Laban sa Hapon (Hukbalahap) and acted as one of its
commanders. His wife Felisa joined to support him. She took care of him while he was ill during the war.

Later life
In 1953, he was captured and sent to Camp Crame with his family to be jailed and tortured under the charge of being a communist. While in prison at Camp Crame, his wife Felisa gave birth to a son. He later died in 1971.

References

1895 births
1971 deaths
Filipino male boxers
Filipino socialists
Filipino sportsperson-politicians
Mayors of places in Pampanga
People from San Fernando, Pampanga
Socialist Party (Philippines) politicians
Kapampangan people
Sportspeople from Pampanga